Boneh-ye Morteza (also Romanized as Boneh-ye Morteẕá; also known as Boneh Mortezā) is a village in Aghili-ye Jonubi Rural District, Aghili District, Gotvand County, Khuzestan Province, Iran. At the 2006 census, its population was 311, in 56 families.

References 

Populated places in Gotvand County